Names play a variety of roles in the Bible. They sometimes relate to the nominee's role in a biblical narrative, as in the case of Nabal, a foolish man whose name means "fool".  Names in the Bible can represent human hopes, divine revelations, or are used to illustrate prophecies.

Most popular names
During the period 330 BC – 200 AD, the most common male names in Judea or post Kingdom of Israel were:
1. Simon/Simeon
2. Joseph/Joses
3. Lazarus
4. Judah
5. John
6. Jesus
7. Ananias
8. Jonathan
9. Matthew/Matthias
10. Manaen
11. James
12. Michael

During this period, the most common female names were:
1. Mary
2. Salome
3. Shelamzion
4. Martha
5-6. Joanna and Sapphira (equally common)
7. Berenice
8-9. Imma and Mara (equally common)
10-12. Cyprus, Sarah, and Alexandra

Lists

List of biblical names starting with A
List of biblical names starting with B
List of biblical names starting with C
List of biblical names starting with D
List of biblical names starting with E
List of biblical names starting with F
List of biblical names starting with G
List of biblical names starting with H
List of biblical names starting with I
List of biblical names starting with J
List of biblical names starting with K
List of biblical names starting with L
List of biblical names starting with M
List of biblical names starting with N
List of biblical names starting with O
List of biblical names starting with P
List of biblical names starting with Q
List of biblical names starting with R
List of biblical names starting with S
List of biblical names starting with T
List of biblical names starting with U
List of biblical names starting with V
List of biblical names starting with Y
List of biblical names starting with Z

See also
Gemstones in the Bible
Genealogies in the Bible
List of major biblical figures
List of minor Old Testament figures, A–K
List of minor Old Testament figures, L–Z
List of minor New Testament figures
List of biblical places
List of animals in the Bible
List of plants in the Bible
List of women in the Bible
List of names for the biblical nameless
List of modern names for biblical place names
Young's Analytical Concordance to the Bible – for which later editions contain A complete list of Scripture Proper Names as in the Authorised and Revised Versions, showing their modern pronunciation and the exact form of the original Hebrew by Wm. B. Stevenson.
Theophory

References

Further reading
Comay, Joan, Who's Who in the Old Testament, Oxford University Press, 1971, 
Elwell, Walter A., Evangelical Dictionary of Theology, Baker Publishing Group, 1984, ISB 9781441200303
Lockyer, Herbert, All the men of the Bible, Zondervan Publishing House (Grand Rapids, Michigan), 1958
Lockyer, Herbert, All the women of the Bible, Zondervan Publishing 1988, 
Lockyer, Herbert, All the Divine Names and Titles in the Bible, Zondervan Publishing 1988, 
Tischler, Nancy M., All things in the Bible: an encyclopedia of the biblical world , Greenwood Publishing, Westport, Conn. : 2006

External links 

Nave's Topical Bible
Smith's Bible Dictionary
Easton's Bible Dictionary
Catholic Encyclopedia 1917
New Schaff-Herzog Encyclopedia of Religious Knowledge (Dictionary edition)